The Trap is a 1966 British-Canadian adventure western film directed by Sidney Hayers. Shot in the wilderness of the Canadian province of British Columbia, Oliver Reed and Rita Tushingham star in this unusual love story about a rough trapper and a mute orphan girl. The soundtrack was composed by Ron Goodwin and the main theme (Main Titles to The Trap) is familiar as the title music used by the BBC for London Marathon coverage.

The film had its World Premiere on 15 September 1966 at the Leicester Square Theatre in the West End of London.

Plot
French-Canadian fur trapper Jean La Bête (Oliver Reed) paddles his canoe through wild water towards the settlement in order to sell a load of furs.
At the settlement, a steamboat is landing and the trader and his foster-child Eve (Rita Tushingham) arrive at the seaport to fetch mail and consumer goods. The trader explains to Eve that the ship brings "Jailbirds ... from the east" and that "their husbands-to-be had bailed them out and paid their fines and their passages with a guarantee of marriage". Later, the captain is auctioning one of those women because her husband-to-be has died in the meantime. Jean La Bête decides to take his chance to buy the wife but he makes his bid too late.

Two Native Americans, Yellow Dog and No Name, have told the Trader that La Bête is dead. The Trader, heavily in debt, has spent money he owes La Bête so that when La Bête calls to collect his dues, the trader has to use own savings, to the fury of his wife. Next day, the trader's wife, to compensate for the loss of her savings, seizes the opportunity to offer her foster-child for a thousand dollars to the simple-minded, rough-cut trapper. She praises the qualities of the shy girl and explains, that her inability to speak is caused from the shock she suffered when she had to witness how her parents were barbarously murdered several years ago.

La Bête finally agrees to buy the mute girl and takes her against her will into the wilderness of British Columbia. Here the strange couple starts a difficult relationship characterized by mistrust and Eve's fear and dislike of the trapper. Eve vehemently rejects the advances of the gruff trapper. La Bête takes her hunting and acquaints her with the beauty and the dangers of the wilderness but here, as well, he fails to win her trust. Eve defends herself from his advances with a knife.

One day, on checking his traps for caught animals, La Bête is threatened by a cougar. He shoots the cat but inadvertently gets his foot into his own bear trap. Badly injured, he tries to drag himself back to his hut, hunted by famished wolves. Eve is waiting at the cabin and hears the distant howling of the wolves approaching the hut. She takes a gun and sets out in search for La Bête; together they get rid of the wolf pack. La Bête's lower left leg is broken, so he asks Eve to bring the medicine man from the next Indian village, a two days trip away. The Canadian winter has already come, so Eve puts on her snowshoes and starts a long, arduous walk over snow-covered hilltops. She finally reaches the village only to find it deserted.

Returning empty-handed, Eve finds La Bête already suffering from sepsis (blood poisoning). Having no time to lose, he urges the terrified girl to immediately cut off his poisoned leg using an axe. After La Bête has tried to stun himself by gulping the last drop of rum, Eve acts as commanded and her patient instantly passes out from pain. Eve nurses the trapper and of necessity learns to hunt on her own and becomes capable of providing for the couple. Eventually, after La Bête learns to say 'please' to her and then thanks her for saving his life and declares he could not live without her, they become intimate.

The morning after, Eve seems to regret her decision and leaves the cabin, holding a rifle against La Bête who follows her to the river, angry and perplexed. Eve flees in his canoe, leaving La Bête floundering in the shallows. Her journey is fraught and she is thrown from the canoe in white-water rapids. The empty canoe is found by native Americans and Eve is rescued, and taken back to the settlement where she was taken from. Although welcome, she remains an outsider. The viewer is told that she remained in bed for two months and lost the child she was carrying. The family have arranged a marriage for her to a man who flirted with her early on in the film. Eve does not appear happy, however.

On the day of marriage, her foster 'sister' and foster mother dress her whilst the 'sister' demands to know how she lived in the wild and if she killed La Bête. Eve runs away again finally to return to the man she has come to love, Jean La Bête. She arrives on the river beach and La Bête touches her face gently, then welcomes her home by telling her to clean the house! Eve smiles. In the last scene, she stands in the doorway and watches La Bête hobbling into the forest singing a song. Eve chops wood and carries it into the cabin.

Cast
 Rita Tushingham as Eve
 Oliver Reed as La Bete
 Rex Sevenoaks as The Trader
 Barbara Chilcott as Trader's Wife
 Linda Goranson as Trader's Daughter
 Blaine Fairman as Clerk
 Walter Marsh as Preacher
 Joseph Golland as Baptiste (as Jo Golland)
 Jon Granik as No Name
 Merv Campone as Yellow Dog
 Reg McReynolds as Captain (as Reginald McReynolds)

Production
Filming took place in autumn 1965 in Panorama Studios in West Vancouver (it was one of the first films ever shot there). It resumed in 1966 in Scotland.

London Marathon theme tune
A tune from Goodwin's score for the film is used every year as the theme tune for the BBC's live coverage of the London Marathon, performed by the Bournemouth Symphony Orchestra.

References

External links
 
 
 Photo gallery at Rita Tushingham fansite

1966 films
1960s adventure drama films
1966 romantic drama films
1966 Western (genre) films
1960s English-language films
Northern (genre) films
British independent films
Canadian independent films
English-language Canadian films
Films set in British Columbia
Films set in the 19th century
Films shot in Vancouver
Films shot in Scotland
Canadian Western (genre) films
British Western (genre) films
Films directed by Sidney Hayers
Films scored by Ron Goodwin
1960s Canadian films
1960s British films
British romantic drama films
Canadian romantic drama films